Castra Buridava was a fort in the Roman province of Dacia.

Gallery

See also
 Buridava
 List of castra in Romania
 List of castra

Notes

External links

Roman castra from Romania - Google Maps / Earth

Roman Dacia
Archaeological sites in Romania
Roman legionary fortresses in Romania
History of Oltenia
Historic monuments in Vâlcea County